In knot theory, Conway notation, invented by John Horton Conway, is a way of describing knots that makes many of their properties clear. It composes a knot using certain operations on tangles to construct it.

Basic concepts

Tangles

In Conway notation, the tangles are generally algebraic 2-tangles.  This means their tangle diagrams consist of 2 arcs and 4 points on the edge of the diagram; furthermore, they are built up from rational tangles using the Conway operations.

[The following seems to be attempting to describe only integer or 1/n rational tangles]
Tangles consisting only of positive crossings are denoted by the number of crossings, or if there are only negative crossings it is denoted by a negative number. If the arcs are not crossed, or can be transformed into an uncrossed position with the Reidemeister moves, it is called the 0 or ∞ tangle, depending on the orientation of the tangle.

Operations on tangles

If a tangle, a, is reflected on the NW-SE line, it is denoted by −a. (Note that this is different from a tangle with a negative number of crossings.)Tangles have three binary operations, sum, product, and ramification, however all can be explained using tangle addition and negation. The tangle product, a b, is equivalent to −a+b. and ramification or a,b, is equivalent to −a+−b.

Advanced concepts
Rational tangles are equivalent if and only if their fractions are equal. An accessible proof of this fact is given in (Kauffman and Lambropoulou 2004). A number before an asterisk, *, denotes the polyhedron number; multiple asterisks indicate that multiple polyhedra of that number exist.

See also
Conway knot
Dowker notation
Alexander–Briggs notation
Gauss notation

References

Further reading

Knot theory
John Horton Conway